"In the End" is a song by American rock band Linkin Park. It is the eighth track on their debut album, Hybrid Theory (2000), and was released as the album's fourth and final single.

"In the End" received positive reviews by music critics, with most reviewers complimenting the song's signature piano riff, as well as noting rapper Mike Shinoda's vocal prominence in the song. "In the End" also achieved mainstream popularity, and was a commercial success upon release. The song reached the top ten on numerous worldwide music charts and reached number two on the US Billboard Hot 100, the band's highest peak on the chart, as well as their first song that peaked within the top 40 in early 2002, making it a sleeper hit. It also reached number one on the Z100 top 100 songs of 2002 countdown. It ranked at number 121 in Blender magazine's The 500 Greatest Songs Since You Were Born. In June 2021, it became the first nu metal song to surpass one billion streams on Spotify.

"In the End" has become one of Linkin Park's most recognizable hits and is considered their signature song. Chester Bennington, the band's lead vocalist, initially disliked the song and did not want it to be included on Hybrid Theory. It was remixed on Reanimation as "Enth E ND". The music video of the song, directed by Nathan Cox and the band's turntablist Joe Hahn, featured the band in a fantasy setting.

Ahead of the release for the 20th anniversary reissue for Hybrid Theory, Linkin Park released a demo version of "In the End" as the second single from the re-release of Hybrid Theory on October 1, 2020.

Release

"In the End" was shipped to radio on September 11 as a single on October 9, 2001. The single CD was released as a "Part 1" single and a "Part 2" single. They differed in tracks and cover color: the "Part 1" cover is yellow and the "Part 2" cover is red. A DVD version of "In the End" was also released which includes an audio version of "In the End", "Crawling" music video and four 30 seconds interviews.

On March 27, 2002, the single was released in Japan as a 7-track CD called In the End: Live & Rare. It contains live tracks of "Papercut", "Points of Authority" and "A Place for My Head", "Step Up" (originally by the early Linkin Park precursor Hybrid Theory that appeared on Hybrid Theory EP), "My December" and "High Voltage".

Music video 
The music video for "In the End" was shot at various stops along the 2001 Ozzfest tour and was directed by Nathan Cox and the band's DJ Joe Hahn, who would go on to direct many of Linkin Park's future videos (the two also directed the music video for "Papercut"). Although the background for the "In the End" video was filmed in a California desert, the band itself performed on a studio stage in Los Angeles, with prominent CGI effects and compositing being used to create the finished version. Performing on a studio stage allowed Hahn and Cox to set off water pipes above the stage near the end and drench the band.

The music video takes place in a fantasy setting and uses massive CGI animation. The band performs atop a giant statue that looks to be Egyptian, which has a 'winged soldier' on top of it, which is similar-looking to the 'winged soldier' on the cover artwork of Linkin Park's Hybrid Theory album.

The portions where Mike Shinoda raps take place first in a wasteland with thorny vines sprouting out of the ground, surrounding him and shattering into dust, (first verse) and then grass and plants sprouting up around him (second verse). During the time Mike raps his verses, Chester stands atop a platform with gargoyles on the edges. This platform is in front of a door in the shape of a trapezoid. Near the end of the video, the skies turn dark and it begins to rain, and the band performs in the downpour until the end of the song, where the rain stops and the camera pans away from the tower, showing the wasteland where Shinoda had rapped in is now a lush Greenland. During the rain the statues on the tower begin to move. Mike Shinoda has mentioned that Princess Mononoke inspired the music video.

The video was co-directed by Nathan "Karma" Cox and LP's turntablist Joe Hahn (who have also directed the videos for "Pts.OF.Athrty", "Papercut", "What I've Done", "Bleed It Out", "Shadow of the Day", and "Leave Out All the Rest"). The production design was by Patrick Tatopoulos who helped design and oversee the production of the non-CGI set. It won the "Best Rock Video" and was nominated for Video of the Year at the 2002 MTV Video Music Awards.

The video premiered on MTV and MuchMusic USA the week ending October 6, 2001.

The video has over 1.5 billion views on YouTube as of March 2023; this is their second music video that reached a billion views next to "Numb". The video was uploaded twice by Linkin Park's YouTube channel. The video was first uploaded on March 4, 2007, in 240p format. The video was later re-uploaded on October 26, 2009, in 360p format. It was also reuploaded on the same day by the Warner Bros. Records YouTube channel in 480p format. The video was shot in 16:9 aspect ratio, and copies available on Linkin Park's (only first upload) and Warner Records YouTube channels are in 4:3 letterboxed format. Second reupload on Linkin Park's YouTube channel is in native 16:9 aspect ratio. Upon the release of the 20th Anniversary Box set for Hybrid Theory, the video was then upgraded to HD quality.

Critical reception
"In the End" received positive reviews by contemporary rock music critics. VH1 ranked it number 84 on its list of the 100 Greatest Songs of the '00s. The song was also ranked number two by Loudwire on its list of "Top 21st century Hard Rock songs". At Stylus magazine, it was highlighted as a "nu metal classic". At Kerrang!, it was included as part of "The Ultimate Nu Metal Mixtape". NME, however, was more critical of the song, calling it "...another slab of gormless MTV rap rock from the bottom of the food chain."

Accolades
In 2015, the song was named as the best rock song in Kerrang!s Rock 100 list followed by the band's 2014 single "Final Masquerade". In the wake of Bennington's passing in 2017, Billboard named "In the End" as the best Linkin Park song and labelled it as one of the best pop songs of the 21st century. In the same year, it was listed as the 133rd best alternative rock hit of all-time by Consequence.

Chart performance
"In the End" is Linkin Park's highest-charting single in the US, debuting at number 78 and peaking at number two on the US Billboard Hot 100 chart in March 2002 and being kept off the top spot by "Ain't It Funny" by Jennifer Lopez and Ja Rule. It stayed on the chart a total of 38 weeks. It reached number one on the Modern Rock Tracks chart for five weeks, starting in December 2001, becoming their first hit on this chart. It has spent 44 weeks there, becoming their longest running on that chart and it also hit number three on the Mainstream Rock Tracks chart spending 40 weeks on the chart, their second longest after "One Step Closer" at 42 weeks. It also reached number one on the Pop Songs chart for five weeks also and it stayed on the chart for 27 weeks. "In the End" was the seventh best performing single on the Billboard Hot 100 during 2002, and was the second best performing rock song and alternative song of the decade on the Alternative Songs chart and the Rock Songs chart only behind Trapt's "Headstrong" and Nickelback's "How You Remind Me" respectively. As of June 2014, the single has sold 2,555,000 copies in the United States.

"In the End" reached the top five on the Canadian BDS Airplay chart and remained in the top five for another month. "In the End" debuted higher on the Canadian Hot 100 than it did in the US and peaked at number one three weeks later for two weeks. It peaked higher in Canada than "Papercut".

The song was released in Australia, Europe and New Zealand on December 22, 2001. "One Step Closer", "Papercut" and "Crawling" reached the UK top 20, while "In the End" reached the top 10. "In the End" continued the trend of higher-charting singles when it debuted and peaked at number eight. It remained in the top 100 of the chart for 20 non-consecutive weeks.

"In the End" debuted at number 44 on December 2, 2001, on the ARIA Charts. It steadily rose to peak at number four on February 10, 2002. It is currently the second most successful song for the band in Australia, tied with "One Step Closer" and behind "New Divide". In the week starting July 30, 2017, the single re-entered the charts, at number 10, more than 15 years since the song last appeared in the top 50, following the death of lead singer Chester Bennington.

"In the End" reached the top 30 in Switzerland and the top 20 in the Netherlands, Ireland, Germany, Belgium and New Zealand. It is also their first single to chart in France, peaking initially at number 40 and remaining in the chart for 17 weeks. But after the suicide of Chester Bennington in July 2017, the song charted at number 23 for one week. Similarly, it also re-entered the UK chart at number 14 on week starting July 30, 2017.

Remixes
The song was remixed with "Izzo (H.O.V.A.)" by hip hop artist Jay-Z on their collaborative extended play, Collision Course, and uses the sample used "Izzo (H.O.V.A.)" of the Jackson 5's "I Want You Back" at the original speed as the beat.

A remix of "In the End", titled "Enth E ND", is included on their remix album Reanimation. The song features hip hop artists Motion Man and KutMasta Kurt. Opposed from the song being a remix, the song also differs with altered lyrics. The song was released as a promotional single with "FRGT/10".

The music video was directed by Jason Goldwatch. It starts off in black and white with someone picking up headphones, interrupted by an image – Mike Shinoda in a car, a flashing image with the letters "LP" written on it, and a TV screen. KutMasta Kurt is shown DJing, then Motion Man is seen in a car, rapping. The camera goes to Mike Shinoda and the video is now in color. The video zooms out to a small screen, then the video becomes black and white again. Mike Shinoda is seen driving a car with KurtMasta Kurt and Motion Man. The video shows the screen again and Mike is seen in color, then becomes black and white again. Mike Shinoda and Motion Man are seen bouncing their heads on screen, then seen driving again. Images flash and Motion Man is seen rapping once again. Random clips are played and Mike Shinoda is once again seen driving, holding a small wired camera.

The Memphis rap group Three Six Mafia sampled this song on their 2001 song "Smoke Dat Weed" and it is featured on Juicy J's 2002 album Chronicles of the Juice Man.

In 2017, producer Markus Schulz made a trance remix of "In the End" as a tribute to Chester Bennington after the latter's death, which he debuted at Tomorrowland.

Covers

In 2018, Tommee Profitt produced a cover of "In the End" sung by Fleurie and Jung Youth. It was used in the first season's fifth episode of Legacies.

Track listing

Personnel
Linkin Park
 Chester Bennington – vocals
 Mike Shinoda – rapping, piano
 Brad Delson – guitar, bass
 Joe Hahn – sampler, turntables
 Rob Bourdon – drums
Production
Produced by Don Gilmore
Executive producer: Jeff Blue
Mixed at Soundtrack, NYC

Charts

Weekly charts

Year-end charts

Decade-end charts

Certifications

Release history

References

Linkin Park songs
Songs written by Mike Shinoda
Warner Records singles
2001 songs
2001 singles
American hard rock songs